Alif Abdullah (born September 21, 1989), better known as Alyph or Alif is a Singaporean-Malay singer, performer, songwriter, composer and producer based in Malaysia. Between 2005 and 2015, Alif was active as part of the Singaporean hip hop and R&B duo, SleeQ, along with his cousin, Syarifullah/Syarif. He is the founder of the record label Black Hat Cat Records. He signed with Def Jam Recordings South East Asia in 2019.

Education 
Started a low-level education at Eunos Primary School and continued his secondary education at the Tanjong Katong Secondary School.

Discography

Albums
6560 Part 1 (2015)
6560 Part 2 (2016)
DETAIL (2018)

Charted songs

References 

1989 births
Living people
Singaporean rappers
Singaporean hip hop musicians
Singaporean people of Malay descent
Singaporean expatriates in Malaysia
Singaporean record producers
Def Jam Recordings artists